The Anti Monopoly Law of China is the People's Republic of China's major legal statute on the subject of competition law (or antitrust law). It was passed by the National People’s Congress in 2007 and came into effect on 1 August 2008.

Definition 

The Anti-Monopoly Law (AML) of China in a narrow sense refers only to the Anti-Monopoly Law of the People’s Republic of China, passed by the National People’s Congress on 30 August 2007, and implemented as of 1 August 2008. In a broad sense it refers to the anti-monopoly legal system of China, including not only the AML, the post-AML ancillary legislative, and legal documents for the purpose of enforcing the AML, but also all pre-AML legislative and administrative documents with an anti-monopoly nature, as well as regulatory or administrative enforcement, private enforcement and judicial procedures.  The definition used here refers to its broad meaning.

History of the Legislation 

It is commonly recognized that the legislation of the anti-monopoly law in China was initiated in August 1987 when an AML drafting team was set up by the former Legal Affairs Bureau of the State Council to formally proceed to draft the AML.  Prior to this, however, and following the economic reforms and opening in China, the State Council had already promulgated The Provisional Rules on Expediting Economic Alliance as early as 1 July 1980, aiming to “break down territorial blockades and departmental barriers.” This was followed by The State Council Provisional Rules on the Launching and Protecting the Socialist Competition on 17 October 1980, aiming to “step by step reform the existing economic management system and actively promote and protect smooth competition;" a third document, the State Council Rules on Further Expediting and Protecting Socialist Competition, was released on 23 March 1986. These three documents served as the earliest form of anti-monopoly law and were intended to break down the historical planning of economic monopolies in the pre-1980’s era and to promote the initial and basic market economy and competition.

Since August 1987 onward, the significant milestones of anti-monopoly law legislation in China are as follows:

 1988: the drafting team produced the Anti-Monopoly and Anti-Unfair Competition Provisional Regulations (Proposal Draft).

 2 September 1993: the Anti Unfair Competition Law was promulgated by the 8th Session of the NPC Standing Committee, implemented as of 1 December 1993.
 1994: the AML was listed in the legislation plan by the 8th Session of the NPC Standing Committee, and the former National Economic and Trade Commission and the State Administration for Industry and Commerce were delegated to be jointly responsible to draft the AML; in May, the AML Draft Steering Team and AML Draft Working Team were set up
 July 1997: the 1st Version of the AML Outline Draft was produced.
 1998: the AML was listed in the legislation plan by the 9th Session of the NPC Standing Committee; in November, the 2nd Version of the AML Outline Draft was produced
 June 2000: the 1st Draft of the AML (Soliciting Opinion Version) was produced
 December 2003: the AML was listed in the legislation plan by the 10th Session of the NPC Standing Committee as one of the fundamental economic legislations
 2004: the AML was listed in the legislation plan by the State Council; on 26 February, the Ministry of Commerce submitted the AML (For Review Version) to the State Council
 February 2005: the AML was listed in the legislation plan by the NPC Standing Committee; in the same year, the State Council set up AML Review and Modify Steering Team, AML Modify Working Team, and AML Review and Modify Expert Team to review and modify the AML (Draft)
 7 June 2006: the AML (Draft) was reviewed, discussed, and passed in principle by the State Council Executive Meeting that also decided to submit it to the NPC Standing Committee for review upon further revision; from 24 to 29 June, the 10th NPC Standing Committee conducted the first read of the AML (Draft)
 from 24 to 29 June 2007: the 10th NPC Standing Committee conducted the second read of the AML (Draft) and third read from 24 to 30 August
 30 August 2007: the 10th NPC Standing Committee passed and promulgated the AML
 1 August 2008: the AML was put into enforcement
 Post-AML Legislative Practice and Development

Landmark Judicial Judgements and Rulings
 Huawei vs. IDC cases
 Ruibang vs. Johnson & Johnson case
 Tencent vs. Qihu 360 case

The Four Cornerstones of the Anti-Monopoly Law of China 

The basic structure and framework of the anti-monopoly law of China up to date include the following legislations and the implementing legal documents (the box at the top contains the post-AML ancillary legal documents, the box in the middle contains the pre-AML laws and legal documents which are still in force, while the box at the bottom contains those laws and legal documents that are still in the processes of either drafting or soliciting opinion):

The doctrines of “illegal per se rule” and “rule of reason” in the anti-monopoly law of China 

The doctrines of “illegal per se rule” (“per se rule”) and the “rule of reason” are two landmark and the most important legal theories in the history and development of the anti-trust law not only in its country of origin but also in many other countries and jurisdictions all over the world.  The doctrines make a clear and straight definition in legal theory and can be efficiently and effectively implemented in practical enforcement.  The fact that the doctrines in the United States have directly, effectively and successfully regulated the market situation and competitive practices, protected and promoted the market competition, and the anti-trust legal theory and practice have been consistently evolving and developing to cope with the market, economic and competition development, makes the doctrines significantly influential in the competition law legislation and enforcement in other countries and jurisdictions.

Literally, the doctrines of “per se rule” and the “rule of reason” can be found in the AML context as well as in the Supreme Court Judicial Opinion on one hand, but it is found otherwise in several court judgement on the other hand.

Legislation 

During the processes of the AML legislation, the AML drafting team had not only studied and referenced to the greatest extent the statues of the EU competition law legislation as a result the basic structure and contents of the AML are as close and similar as the EU competition law, but had also studied the US antitrust legal theory and cases and consulted the US antitrust law experts.  As such, the spirit of the doctrines of “per se rule” and the “rule of reason” indeed exists or influences the creation of the AML.

In the legislation, as far as the literal provisions of the AML is concerned, it is found that Articles 13 (horizontal agreement), 14 (vertical Agreement) and 17(1) (abuse of dominant market position) as one category using the literal word "prohibit" without any pre condition, while there is a condition of "reasonable cause" for the "prohibition" in Articles 17(2) to (6) (abuse of dominant market position without justifiable cause) as another category, as a result making literal difference that there should be different legislative purposes and intents as well as different legal meanings in the AML between the above two categories: with regard to the unconditional prohibition in the first category on one hand, any agreement or conduct breaching unconditional prohibition will then constitute a violation of law without regard to the result or effect caused by the violation, as such these unconditional prohibitions can be treated or argued to have the nature or character of "illegal per se" and accordingly it is an alternative expression of "illegal per se rule" in the AML; while with regard to Articles 17(2) to (6), on the other hand, the literal words "reasonable cause", given its obvious literal meaning, will then be an alternative expression of the "rule of reason".

Supreme Court Judicial Opinion 

In the judicial opinion, however, unlike the EU Court of First Instance in Case T-112/99 M6 and Others v Commission has expressly denied the existence of "rule of reason" in the EU competition law, China Supreme Court by far has yet clearly clarified and it has been hesitating in its Judicial Opinions on Several Issues Concerning the Application of Law in Proceeding Civil Cases Caused by Monopolistic Conducts (Fa Shi [2012] No. 5) (hereinafter the “SCJO”) if the "illegal per se rule" and the "rule of reason" exists in the anti-monopoly legal system of China or can be invoked in the practical enforcement cases or not, in other words, it still remains unclear if Articles 13, 14 and 17(1) as one category would have the nature of "illegal per se" and only Articles 17(2) to (6) as another category subject to the "rule of reason", or if there is any different legislative purpose and intent and different legal meaning or not between the two categories.  As a result, also unlike the EU Court of First Instance in the same Case T-112/99 that has clearly stated that the pro- or anti-competition aspects should be examined within the scope of Article 85(3) of the EU Treaty, otherwise “Article 85(3) of the Treaty would lose much of its effectiveness if such an examination had to be carried out already under Article 85(1) of the Treaty”, China Supreme Court has further left unclear if the "reasonable cause" provided in Articles 17(2) to (6) is limited to the pre-set scope in Article 15 or all relevant pro- or anti-competition aspects of undertaking and the relevant market can be taken into account and examined according to the doctrine of "rule of reason".

In the Supreme Court Judicial Opinions on Several Issues Concerning the Application of Law in Proceeding Anti-Monopoly Civil Dispute Cases (Soliciting Comment Version) Circulated by the China Supreme Court on 25 April 2011 (hereinafter the “SCJO SCV”), unlike in the literal provisions of the AML, it seems to draw no distinction as between Articles 13, 14 and 17(1) as one category Articles 17(2) to (6) as another category as initially drafted as in Article 8 of the SCJO : “The victims of the monopoly agreements shall have burden of proof against the alleged monopoly agreements for the effects of the exclusion or restriction of competition.  The victims shall not have burden of proof against such monopoly agreements for the effects of the exclusion or restriction of competition if the monopoly agreements fall within the scope of Articles 13(1) to (5) or Articles 14(1) and (2), except for if the alleged undertakings to the said monopoly agreements are able to prove otherwise by the contrary evidence.” which could be read as that both Articles 13(1) to (5) or Articles 14(1) and (2) are subject to effect examination (rule of reason).

In the official SCJO, however, Article 7 of the SCJO merely provides that “the defendant shall have burden of proof for no effect of exclusion and restriction of competition for acts falling within the monopoly agreements under Articles 13(1) to (5)”, which draws an obvious distinction between the formally equal Article 13, per se illegal unless defendant proves otherwise, and Article 14, subject to plaintiff’s burden of proof on effect (or rule of reason) examination. Article 8 of the SCJO also seems to have drawn an unclear distinguish on burden of proof between Article 17(1) from Articles 17(2) to (6) by saying “plaintiff shall [only] have burden of proof for the dominant position, and the abuse of such dominant position by the defendant in the relevant market”, alleged defendant monopoly conduct will be justified unless plaintiff proves illegal by effect examination (or rule of reason); this Article 8 seems to make AML Article 17(1) equal to Articles 17(2) to (6)  that both are subject to the effect examination.

Judicial Judgements 

This topic, especially as to if there is any difference between Articles 13 and 14, remained unclear until the Ruibang vs. J&J case that Shanghai High Court made a very judgement on 1 August 2013 in which including an analysis on the interrelations between AML Articles 13 and 14.  Shanghai High Court examined and concluded that “the effects of exclusion and restriction of competition are the constitutive and necessary factors in the examination of monopoly agreement with clause of restricting the minimum resale price as referred to in Article 14 of the AML”.  From this ruling and the position that Shanghai High Court allowed both plaintiff and defendant to submit and cross examine the reports prepared by the economic experts on the relevant markets, J&J’s products and its market share, the effects of pro- and anti-competition of the alleged vertical agreement in question with restriction on the minimum resale price, etc., it appears that Shanghai High Court is rather in favour of agreeing to conduct a comprehensive examination of all related aspects in particular of the pro- and anti-competition effects of "Article 14 agreements" in accordance with the doctrine of the “rule of reason”.

Administrative Enforcement 

Nonetheless the above, however, in the administrative enforcement, it appears that the NDRC is rather apt to apply the doctrine of “illegal per se rule” directly to the first category (i.e., AML Articles 13, 14 and 17(1)) because of the low difficulty and costs and easy proceeding to apply the “per se rule” in the administrative enforcement of the AML.  This is evidenced by the most recent four major cases that NDRC announced during January to August 2013  because neither examination nor analysis on the “reason” or “reasonable cause” had ever been made to the effects of restriction or exclusion of competition by the alleged monopolistic conducts.  Albeit this has been questioned, NDRC appears to follow and carry on the strategy and tactics that were adopted in the US in the early stage of the enforcement of Sherman Act at the turn of 19th and 20th centuries to put a direct “illegal per se” effect to the AML Articles 13 and 14.  This makes very important sense because it is drawing a boundary line as between the “illegal per se” conducts and agreement and those conducts and agreement with “reasonable cause”.

In a summary, until the Supreme Court clearly interprets this important issue by further judicial opinions or rulings, whether or not the unconditional prohibition in Articles 13 and 14 would equally have similar nature of "illegal per se" and how to distinguish Articles 13 and 14 them from the "reasonable cause" in Articles 17(2) to (6), still remain an open topic in the anti-monopoly legal system in China.

Legal Applicable Exemptions 

The AML adopts in Article 15 the same doctrine of “legal applicable exceptions” as in Article 81(3) of the EU Treaty.  Unlike the EU competition law that the EU Commission has promulgated and implemented various specific regulations for the purpose of implementing and enforcing Article 81(3), however, several fundamental issues such as the specific contents and criteria of the “legal exceptions”, who has the authority or being authorized to stipulate the implementing rules, by the NPC Standing Committee, the State Council, or the NDRC or SAIC, still remain unclear in the anti-monopoly legal system.  In private enforcement, the contents and criteria of the proof of evidences for “reasonable cause” and whether the assessment and comparison between pro-competition vs. anti-competition are limited within the preset scope of AML Article 15 only or can include all reasonable  causes in all relevant aspects or elements beyond AML Article 15, also remain unclear.

Some Landmark Cases and Judicial Judgements 

There is no precedent case law in China.  The judgements, especially those methodological or judicial examinations in the judicial rulings or opinions made by the high court or the Supreme Court in the landmark cases, are commonly studied by law practitioners, academic researchers and sometimes indirectly as a principle or guideline invoked by other courts in the subsequent cases.

'Huawei v. IDC cases' 

In 2011, Huawei brought two separate litigations against the same group of defendants of Inter Digital Corporation, Inc. and its affiliated companies (IDC).  The first case was brought to Shenzhen Intermediate Court for the judicial ruling on the royalty rate by Huawei to IDC for certain patent licenses ([2011] Shen Zhong Fa Zhi Min Chu Zi No. 857, Case 857) and the second on was also brought to Shenzhen Intermediate Court for damages caused by IDC’s abuse of dominant market position ([2011] Shen Zhong Fa Zhi Min Chu Zi No. 858, Case 858).  Both cases were appealed to the Guangdong Provincial High Court. Guangdong Provincial High Court made the final judgement on the first Huawei v. IDC case (Case No. 857) On 16 October 2013 ([2013] Yue Gao Fa Min San Zhong Zi No 305, Judgement 305) and on the second one (Case 858) on 21 October 2013 ([2013] Yue Gao Fa Min San Zhong Zi No 306, Judgement 306).  Upon the petition of both Huawei and IDC, both cases were not publicly heard due to the large amount of sensitive commercial and technical information and data.

The two judgements made by Guangdong High Court are published in which all sensitive information and data are redacted. Both cases and the two judgements, usually treated as one combined case by Huawei against IDC, have been appraised by the China Courts as one of the best 10 AML cases by then, while commented by the public as very controversial.  The following can be considered:

(1)	In Judgement 305 (Case 857): there is an extremely lack of (1) judicial analysis to justify and support the ruling on choices of Chinese law and the forum jurisdiction of the China court in a royalty rate case arising from, or at least substantially depending on the interpretation of, royalty policy and rules of the European Telecommunications Standards Institute ETSI, which is organized and governed by French law; (2) legal grounds under the current Chinese law on the [discretionary] right of the court in determining a non-tort (or infringement), non-breach of contract, but a pure commercial term as well as its other judicial rulings.

(2)	On 14 April 2014, IDC filed a petition to the China Supreme Court for retrial and seeking a dismissal of this judgement or at least a higher, market-based royalty rate.  It is currently pending with China Supreme Court.

(3)	In Judgement 306 (Case 858), this is rather an “abuse of intellectual property right” case under AML Article 55 than an “abuse of dominant market position” case under AML Article 17, Guangdong High Court finally upheld the initial judgement to judge IDC to compensate Huawei RMB20 million. this final Ruling covered two AML aspects both of which are not only jurisprudence important but also leading edge.  The first aspect is the “extraterritoriality” under AML Article 2, while the second aspect is that the Ruling appears to make use of the “abuse of dominant market position” under AML Article 17 for the “abuse of intellectual property right” case under AML Article 55.  (1) AML Article 2 is itself too general and vague which merely empowers the right and offers possibility to apply “extraterritorial jurisdiction”.  As to how to apply such “extraterritorial jurisdiction”, the detailed rules, conditions and criteria in the application, neither AML nor the Supreme Court has yet made any clear implementing regulations, interpretation or guideline, but would rather merely rely on the discretionary power of the competent court.  Taking these into account in conjunction with the complicated factors of either or both private and public international laws that may be associated with the application of “extraterritorial jurisdiction” as well as that many other courts may possibly follow after this Ruling to apply the “extraterritorial jurisdiction” in other cases, it appears to be desirable and urgent for the Supreme Court to make judicial ruling as to how to appropriately and delicately apply the “extraterritorial jurisdiction”.  (2) Because this Ruling may be a modeling precedent of making use of the “abuse of dominant market position” under AML Article 17 for the “abuse of intellectual property right” case under AML Article 55 or even it is merely an “abuse of dominant market position” case involving intellectual property right elements, how to treat and balance the prohibition of “abuse of intellectual property right” verse the lawful proprietary, exclusive or monopolistic right of the intellectual property right as well as verse the legal exception of application of the AML provided in the same AML Article 55, and how to treat the anti-monopoly provisions provided by the AML verse the lawful proprietary, exclusive or monopolistic right of the intellectual property right provided by intellectual property laws such as Patent Law, all of such complicated and delicate issues remain unclear and uncertain pending the Supreme Court judicial opinion, in order to not only protect competition and prohibit monopoly but also to protect the intellectual property right as well as its lawful proprietary, exclusive or monopolistic right.

NDRC, upon Huawei’s petition (or informant), launched the formal AML investigation against IDC in June 2013.  With the high pressure from the NDRC, IDC eventually reached a private settlement with NDRC by making certain commitments leading to NDRC withdrawing the investigation in May 2014.  It is widely believed that both courts (of Shenzhen Municipality and Guangdong Province) and NDRC played both judicial and administrative sticks against IDC to support Huawei’s launching and development in the US market.

'Ruibang v. Johnson & Johnson cases' 

This is the first judicial case and judgement of vertical monopoly agreement under AML Article 14.2, as well as the first case that the High Court (of appeal) overruled the judgement in favour of the defendant made by the Intermediate Court (of first instance).

The fact of the case is simple and straightforward: Ruibang Yonghe Technology Co., Ltd. ("Ruibang"), the plaintiff in this case, is an authorized distributor of Johnson & Johnson (Shanghai) Medical Equipment Co., Ltd. and Johnson & Johnson (China) Medical Equipment Co., Ltd. ("J&J"), the defendants in the case, in the authorized territory under a distribution agreement.  Ruibang sued J&J to the Shanghai Pudong New District Court for J&J's partially withdraw of Ruibang's distributorship, taking off Ruibang's distributor deposit and eventually refusing to supply by reason of Ruibang's breach of lowest re-sell price in the unauthorized territory.  Both courts (of first instance and appeal) made similar judicial analysis in term of AML Article 14.2, Shanghai New District Court made a judgement on 18 May 2012 (Judgement (2010) Hu Yi Zhong Min Wu (Zhi) Chi Zi No 169) in favour of J&J on the ground of plaintiff's insufficient evidence.  Ruibang appealed to the Shanghai High Court and submitted a very comprehensive expert affidavit made by a professor of China Foreign Economic and Trade University, as a defending fight back J&J also submitted the a comprehensive expert affidavit made by a professor of Shanghai Finance and Economic University.  The Shanghai High Court conclusively made a judgement on 1 August 2013 (Judgement (2012) Hu Gao Min San (Zhi) Zhong Zi No 63) that overruled the judgement made by the Shanghai Pudong New District Court ruling that J&J had violated AML Article 14.2 and be liable for the judged damages.

This case and its final judgement offer some observation:

(1)	Under the AML, the vertical agreement is subject to “rule of reason”, namely, it is not “per se illegal” but very likely “per se challengeable” and “effect” test is necessary to assess if a vertical agreement breaches the AML, or not.

(2)	Four elements in the “effect” test: (1) sufficient competition, (2) market position, (3) motivation, and (4) effects of competition restriction and competition promotion.

(3)	The application of the doctrine of maxim semper necessitas probandi incumbit ei qui agit in the AML private enforcement case.

'360 v. Tencent case' 

This is a case of the “abuse of dominant market position”, the first AML private enforcement case that was initially brought to and examined by the provincial High Court, then appealed to and finally judged by the Supreme Court.

The AML Notification in the Concentration of Undertakings 

7.1  It is commonly known and recognized that the investment by foreign investors in the form of M&A (including concentration of undertakings) is subject to the government approval in China which is mainly compromising of the following three parts in accordance with the relevant PRC laws and regulations:

7.2  In which the thresholds and roadmap for the AML Notification and Review insofar as related to the concentration of undertakings can be summarized as follows:

					      
7.3  As far as the security review is concerned, according to the related laws and regulations concerning security review, such review may be a separate procedure with regard to the foreign investment in China, but may also be a part of or post-AML notification and review procedures for the foreign investment in China.  The procedures and roadmap of the security review can be summarized as follows:

7.4  The Legal Liabilities for the violation of the AML concerning the concentration of undertakings are summarized as follows:

Administrative, Regulatory, and Judicial Enforcement Agencies 

8.1  Under the AML, the hierarchy of the China anti monopoly enforcement and regulatory authorities is as follows:

8.2  In accordance with the State Council General Office Notice regarding the State Council Anti Monopoly Committee’s Key Responsibilities and Members (Guo Ban Fa [2008] No 104), The State Council Anti Monopoly Committee was established on 28 July 2008, whose key responsibilities include: research and draft competition policy, organizing to investigate and evaluate the general market competition situation and publish the evaluation report, produce and promulgate ant monopoly guidelines, coordinate the anti monopoly enforcement, as well as other duties stipulated by the State Council.  Its members include:

Director General:

Wang Yang, Vice Prime Minister

Deputy Director General:

Chen De Min, Minister, MOFCOM

Zhang Ping, Commissioner, NDRC

Zhou Bo Hua, Director General, SAIC

Bi Jing Quan, Deputy Secretary General of the State Council

Members:

Zhang Mao, Vice Commissioner, NDRC

Ou Xin Qin, Vice Minister, MIIT

Yao Zeng Ke, Vice Minister, Ministry of Supervisory

Zhang Shao Chun, Vice Minister, MOF

Gao Hong Feng, Vice Minister, MOC

Ma Xiu Hong, Vice Minister, MOFCOM

Huang Shu He, Vice Commissioner, SASAC

Zhong You Ping, Deputy Director General, SAIC

Zhang Qin, Deputy Director General, SIPO

Zhang Qiong, Legal Office of the State Council (and also as the Head of the Anti Monopoly Expert Panel)

Cai E’sheng, Vice Chairman, CBRC

Gui Min Jie, Vice Chairman, CSRC

Wei Ying Ning, Vice Chairman, CIRC

Wang Yu Min, Vice Chairman, SERC

Secretary General: Ma Xiu Hong

Director of General Office: Shang Ming, Director, MOFCOM AMB

8.3  The Organizational Structure and Responsibilities of the China AML Enforcement and Regulatory Authorities

Appendix 2: Official websites of China AML legislative, enforcement and regulatory authorities 

NPC: http://www.npc.gov.cn/wxzl/gongbao/node_4508.htm

MOFCOM: http://fldj.mofcom.gov.cn/?566796080=822957196

NDRC: https://web.archive.org/web/20131102220131/http://jjs.ndrc.gov.cn/default.htm

SAIC: http://www.saic.gov.cn/fldyfbzdjz/

See also 
Chinese law
Law of the People's Republic of China
360 v. Tencent

References

Chinese business law
China